Vahagn Minasyan (born 25 April 1985 in Yerevan, Soviet Armenia), is an Armenian football defender, who plays for the Armenian Premier League club Alashkert FC. Vahagn participated in 12 international matches and scored 1 goal for the Armenia national team since his debut in a Euro-2008 qualifying match against Kazakhstan on 2 June 2007.

International career

International goals
Scores and results list Armenia's goal tally first.

References

External links

Profile at FFA website

Living people
1985 births
Footballers from Yerevan
Armenian footballers
Armenian expatriate footballers
Armenia international footballers
Association football defenders
FC Ararat Yerevan players
FC Pyunik players
FC Mika players
Armenian Premier League players
FC Alashkert players